The 1971 Wichita Shockers football team was an American football team that represented Wichita State University as a member of the Missouri Valley Conference (MVC) during the 1971 NCAA University Division football season. In its second season under head coach Bob Seaman, the team compiled an overall record of 3–8 record with mark of 0–4 against conference opponents, finished last out of seven teams in the MVC, and was outscored by a total of 268 to 149.  The team played its home games at Cessna Stadium in Wichita, Kansas. 

During the prior season, the team lost 14 of its players and its head coach in the Wichita State University football team plane crash. Several players injured in the crash, including Randy Jackson, returned to play for the 1971 team.

The team's statistical leaders included Tom Owen with 613 passing yards, Randy Jackson with 820 rushing yards and 48 points scored, Bill Moore with 318 receiving yards.

Schedule

Notes

References

Wichita State
Wichita State Shockers football seasons
Wichita State Shockers football